Mocha Dick (died 1838) was a male sperm whale that lived in the Pacific Ocean in the early 19th century, usually  encountered in the waters near Mocha Island, off the central coast of Chile. American explorer and author Jeremiah N. Reynolds published his account, "Mocha Dick: Or The White Whale of the Pacific: A Leaf from a Manuscript Journal" in 1839 in The Knickerbocker. Mocha Dick was an albino and partially inspired Herman Melville's 1851 novel Moby-Dick.

History
Mocha Dick survived many skirmishes (by Reynolds' account at least 100) with whalers before he was eventually killed. He was large and powerful, capable of wrecking small craft with his fluke. Explorer Jeremiah N. Reynolds gathered first-hand observations of Mocha Dick and published his account, "Mocha Dick: Or The White Whale of the Pacific: A Leaf from a Manuscript Journal", in the May 1839 issue of The Knickerbocker. Reynolds described Mocha Dick as "an old bull whale, of prodigious size and strength... white as wool. According to Reynolds, Mocha Dick's head was covered with barnacles, which gave him a rugged appearance. The whale also had a peculiar method of spouting:

Mocha Dick was most likely first encountered and attacked sometime before 1810 off Mocha Island. His survival of the first encounters coupled with his unusual appearance quickly made him famous among Nantucket whalers. Many captains attempted to hunt him after rounding Cape Horn. Mocha Dick was quite docile, sometimes swimming alongside the ship, but once attacked he retaliated with ferocity and cunning, and was widely feared by harpooners. When agitated he would sound and then breach so aggressively that his entire body would sometimes come completely out of the water.

In Reynolds' account, Mocha Dick was killed in 1838, after he appeared to come to the aid of a distraught cow whose calf had just been slain by the whalers. His body was 70 feet long and yielded 100 barrels of oil, along with some ambergris—a substance used in the making of perfumes and at times worth more per ounce than gold. He also had twenty harpoons in his body.

A decade later, The Knickerbocker reported another sighting of Mocha Dick in the Arctic Ocean, concluding "Vive Mocha Dick!".

Legacy
Mocha Dick was not, apparently, the only white whale in the sea. A Swedish whaler claimed to have taken a very old white whale off the coast of Brazil in 1859. In 1902, the New Bedford whaling bark Platina, captained by Thomas McKenzie, harpooned and killed an albino sperm whale near the Azores in the Atlantic Ocean, using a harpoon tipped with an explosive device. Amos Smalley harpooned the white whale and recounted his experience to Reader's Digest. He remembers Captain McKenzie estimating by the wear on the whale's teeth that it was "at least a hundred years old, maybe two hundred". Smalley was a guest at the premiere of John Huston's film Moby Dick, 1956, where he was introduced as "the man who killed Moby Dick".

In 1952, Time magazine reported the harpooning of a white whale off the coast of Peru. Since 1991, there have been sightings reported of a white humpback whale near Australia, nicknamed Migaloo. In 2012, a white humpback, nicknamed Willow the White Whale, was filmed off the coast of Norway. Sightings of white sperm whales have been recorded off Sardinia in the Mediterranean Sea in 2006 and 2015.

See also
 List of individual cetaceans

References

Further reading
 Almy, Robert F. "J. N. Reynolds: A Brief Biography with Particular Reference to Poe and Symmes." The Colophon, 2 (1937): 227–245
 Howe, Henry. "The Romantic History of Jeremiah N. Reynolds." Historical Collections of Ohio, vol 2. Cincinnati, 1889.

External links
Last, David, et al. "Collisions Between Ships and Whales", Marine Mammal Science, 17(1):35–75 (January 2001) 
Rogers, Ben. "From Mocha Dick to Moby Dick: Fishing for Clues to Moby's Name and Color", Names: A Journal of Onamastics. Vol. 46, No. 4, Dec. 1988, pp. 263–276. 
Tierney, Erik. "Moby Dick - Mocha Dick", All About Stuff.

18th-century animal births
1838 animal deaths
Individual albino animals
Moby-Dick
American folklore
Maritime folklore
Individual sperm whales
Chilean legends
Whaling in Chile